Tai Tau Chau is an island in the Southern District, Hong Kong. Geographically, it is located in the southern Hong Kong Island. It connected to the Shek O Headland by a footbridge and a gravelbar (tombolo) under it. The island itself is uninhabited.

Geography
On the sides of Tai Tau Chau and Shek O Headland were Island Bay and Shek O Wan (Rocky Bay) respectively. On the south of Tai Tau Chau, is another island Ng Fan Chau. Shek O Headland and Tai Tau Chau are evidently as one rock formation, but was separated due to erosion, forming the tombolo between the headland and the island.

History
The waters surrounding Tai Tau Chau and Shek O is a black spot for human smuggling and trafficking. It was reported that, as of 15 October 1979, 16 illegal immigrants from that boat were missing, which a few swam to Shek O Beach and trying to sneak to the city centre. And the rest of them were presume drown. Police also caught and rescued an additional 22 illegal immigrants, plus 9 corpses were discovered. On 14 October 1979, another boat was discovered near the island, but the illegal immigrants escaped before the arrival of the police. At that time Hong Kong had a policy that once the illegal immigrants had reached the city centre without being caught, they can apply for Hong Kong identity cards. The policy was terminated in 1980.

In 1982, another 15 illegal immigrants arrived Tai Tau Chau by using a sampan.

Facilities

Tai Tau Chau has footpaths for hikers. It is part of Shek O Headland Picnic Area. Accidents were also reported. For example, a rock climber injured her legs when falling from the cliff of the island in 1977. In 1990, another rock climber was rescued by the firefighter.

The island was used to be connected to Shek O Headland by a footbridge, as well as a tombolo that would be covered by water during high tides. However, the bridge was destroyed by a typhoon in 2018 and being re-built as of 2019.

Along the bridge deck, a waste water pipe was installed to transport waste water from Shek O Preliminary Treatment Works to the island and then release to the Tathong Channel. The pipe was also destroyed in that typhoon and the waste water had polluted the beach nearby.

References

Islands of Hong Kong
Southern District, Hong Kong
Populated places in Hong Kong